A happiness pump is a philosophical thought experiment.  It is a critique of utilitarianism.  A happiness pump is someone who will do anything to increase other people's well-being even if it reduces their own profoundly.  They have turned themselves into a machine (a "pump") that makes happiness.

Utilitarianism states that actions that make more happiness or less pain are good and actions that reduce happiness or increase pain are bad and treats them as measurable and discrete.  In utilitarianism, it does not matter who is becoming happier or feeling less pain.  The happiness pump is a person who has taken utilitarianism too far and will give themselves great pain so long as they believe it makes other people somewhere in the world much happier.

Philosopher Joshua David Greene says it is almost impossible for a happiness pump to exist in real life because anyone who tried would give up very shortly.

In popular culture

A happiness pump character appears in one episode of the television show The Good Place.

Related pages
Thought experiment
The Ones Who Walk Away from Omelas

References

Utilitarianism
Consequentialism
Thought experiments